Ženski nogometni klub MB Tabor or simply ŽNK MB Tabor is a Slovenian women's football team from Maribor.

History
Founded in 2005 as ŽNK Maribor, the club began competing in the Slovenian Women's League in the 2006–07 season. The team ranked last and second to last in its first two seasons, but then finished third in 2009. In the next three seasons they finished in sixth place. Nina Kovačič (2007), Monika Žunkovič (2008 and 2011) and Urška Pavlec (2009 and 2010) have been the team's top scorers in its first five seasons.

In February 2019, the club merged with the men's football club NK Maribor Tabor. After the 2020–21 season, the club withdrew from the league.

References

External links
Official website 

Association football clubs established in 2005
Women's football clubs in Slovenia
Sport in Maribor
2005 establishments in Slovenia